Egg in beer refers to the practice, literally or figuratively, of cracking a raw egg into a glass of beer. The term is used metaphorically, commonly as "what do you want, egg in your beer?" implying that the listener already has something good but is asking for undeservedly more.

Literal
In 1915, industry journal The Mixer and Server noted a Seattle case where a judge decreed that an egg, once cracked into a glass of beer, qualified as a drink and was not in violation of ordinances against giving free food in bars.

A 1939 article in Printing magazine notes that Pennsylvania State Brewers' Association had launched a public-relations campaign to "sell the idea that eggs and beer make a pleasing combination." Other Pennsylvania sources refers to this as a "miner's breakfast".

Metaphorical

Sources differ as to the origin of the colloquialism, with some stating it dates to World War II while others speculate that it dates to the 19th century. However, a 1933 article in the Stevens Indicator, mentioning an employee who had not received a raise, notes: "What do you expect, Carl? Egg in your beer?"

References

Further reading 

Cocktails with beer
Cocktails with eggs
Two-ingredient cocktails